Nell O'Day (September 22, 1909 – January 3, 1989) was an accomplished American equestrian and B-movie actress of the 1930s and 1940s.

Biography
O'Day was born in Prairie Hill, Texas. Her father was an official with a railroad. Her first work as a professional entertainer was as a vaudeville dancer. 

She had her first screen roles in the 1920s as a teenager. In 1930, she portrayed Maribelle Fordyce in the Broadway musical Fine and Dandy. Her first starring role was in 1932 when she starred in Rackety Rax opposite Victor McLaglen and Greta Nissan. From 1933 through 1940 she starred in nineteen films, with only a small number of those being western films. Starting in 1941 she began starring in roles placing her as the heroine in westerns, often opposite Johnny Mack Brown, Ray "Crash" Corrigan, Max Terhune, and John 'Dusty' King.

O'Day's other Broadway credits included Many Mansions (1937), One for the Money (1939), and Many Happy Returns (1945).

In 1942 she starred as the heroine in several cliffhanger episodes of Perils of the Royal Mounted. In 1943, under contract with Republic Pictures, she began starring in the Three Mesquiteers film series, alongside Bob Steele, Tom Tyler and Jimmie Dodd. Her last starring western role was in 1943, in the film Boss of Rawhide, opposite Dave O'Brien. She made one more movie, a non-western, in 1946 when she starred in The Story of Kenneth W. Randall M.D., but concentrated mostly on writing screenplays and stage plays.

She spent the rest of her life writing for stage and screen. She died of a heart attack on January 3, 1989, in Los Angeles, California.

Partial filmography

Twinkletoes (1926) - Ballerina in Teacup (uncredited)
King of Jazz (1930) - Dancer with Tommy Atkins Sextette
Rackety Rax (1932) - Doris
Smoke Lightning (1933) - Dorothy Benson
This Side of Heaven (1934) - Miss Spence - Maxwell's Secretary (uncredited)
The Road to Ruin (1934) - Eve Monroe
Woman in the Dark (1934) - Helen Grant
Convention Girl (1935) - Daisy Miller
Boss of Bullion City (1940) - Martha Hadley
Saturday's Children (1940) - Girl at Party (uncredited)
Flight Angels (1940) - Sue
Son of Roaring Dan (1940) - Jane Belden
Law and Order (1940) - Sally Dixon
Pony Post (1940) - Norma Reeves
Back Street (1941) - Elizabeth Saxel
Double Date (1941) - Mary
Bury Me Not on the Open Prairie (1941) - Edna Fielding
Law of the Range (1941) - Mary O'Brien
Hello, Sucker (1941) - Model
Rawhide Rangers (1941) - Patti McDowell
Man from Montana (1941) - Sally Preston
Sing Another Chorus (1941) - Girl (uncredited)
Never Give a Sucker an Even Break (1941) - The Salesgirl
The Masked Rider (1941) - Jean Malone
Arizona Cyclone (1941) - Claire Randolph
Fighting Bill Fargo (1941) - Julie Fargo
Stagecoach Buckaroo (1942) - Molly Denton
The Mystery of Marie Roget (1942) - Camille
You're Telling Me (1942) - Girl (uncredited)
Perils of the Royal Mounted (1942, Serial) - Diana Blake
There's One Born Every Minute (1942) - Antoinette (uncredited)
Arizona Stage Coach (1942) - Dorrie Willard
Pirates of the Prairie (1942) - Helen Spencer
Thundering Trails (1943) - Edith Walker
The Return of the Rangers (1943) - Anne Miller
Boss of Rawhide (1943) - Mary Colby
The Story of Kenneth W. Randall, M.D. (1946) - Martha Randall

References

External links

 
 
 

1909 births
1989 deaths
People from Washington County, Texas
Actresses from Texas
Screenwriters from Texas
American women screenwriters
American women dramatists and playwrights
American film actresses
20th-century American actresses
20th-century American dramatists and playwrights
20th-century American women writers
20th-century American screenwriters
Film serial actresses
Western (genre) film actresses
Vaudeville performers